Mehnert is a surname. Notable people with the surname include:

Björn Mehnert (born 1976), German football player
George Mehnert (1881–1948), American wrestler
Katie Mehnert (born 1975), American businesswoman
Klaus Mehnert (1906-1984), German political scientist and journalist
Marcus Mehnert (born 1997), Norwegian football player
Siegfried Mehnert (born 1963), German boxer

Surnames from given names